Aleksandra Nikolaevna Bocharova (born 6 May 1943) is a retired Russian rower who won six medals in quad sculls at the European championships of 1966–1971.

References

External links
 

1943 births
Living people
Russian female rowers
Soviet female rowers
European Rowing Championships medalists